GAIA: Ecological Perspectives for Science and Society (Gaia: Ökologische Perspektiven für Wissenschaft und Gesellschaft) is a peer-reviewed academic journal established in 1992. Its main focus is on background information, analyses, and solutions of environmental and sustainability problems. Since 2001 it is published by oekom verlag. Articles are in English and German. The editor-in-chief is Helga Weisz (PIK Potsdam).
GAIA follows the Green Road to Open Access: Authors can archive their article for free public use on personal websites and/or in any open access repository immediately after publication (no embargo period).
Authors retain copyright: All articles are published under the terms of the Creative Commons Attribution license CC BY 4.0.
Additionally, GAIA offers GAIA Hybrid Option: With this option authors can publish their articles with full open access against a basic charge.

Sections 

The journal contains the following sections:

 Magazine: reporting on ongoing environmental and sustainability research, environmental policy, and research promotion
 Forum: original papers, including essays, expressions of opinion, and reactions to articles that have appeared in recent issues
 Research: original scientific articles about environmental and sustainability research
 Books: reviews of new publications

Masters Student Paper Award 
In 2014 the GAIA Masters Student Paper Award was established. It recognizes outstanding results from young scientists in the field of environmental and sustainability research. The prize is awarded in cooperation with the Selbach-Umwelt-Stiftung.

Abstracting and indexing 
The journal is abstracted and indexed in:

According to the Journal Citation Reports, the journal has a 2019 impact factor of 1.875.

References

External links 
 Website GAIA (English)
 IngentaConnect (full text version)
 oekom verlag

Multilingual journals
Quarterly journals
Environmental social science journals